Helvella ephippium is a species of fungi in the family Helvellaceae, Pezizales order. It is found in woodland and is variously listed as inedible or "edible but uninspiring"

Distribution
This is a European species, also recorded in China.

References

ephippium
Fungi of China
Fungi of Europe
Fungi described in 1841
Taxa named by Joseph-Henri Léveillé